Maura may refer to:

Maura (given name), a feminine given name
Antonio Maura (1853–1925), Prime Minister of Spain
Carmen Maura (born 1945), Spanish actress
Miguel Maura (1887–1971), Spanish politician
Santa Maura, a former name of the Greek island of Lefkada
Muara, Brunei, a town in Brunei Darussalam
Maura, Norway, a village
Maura (insect), a genus of grasshoppers in the subfamily Pyrgomorphinae

See also
Mauro (disambiguation)
Maurus (disambiguation)
San Mauro (disambiguation)